Cathal mac Tigernán (died 1059) was King of Iar Connacht.

Biography

Áed in Gai Bernaig, King of Connacht from 1046 to 1067, had invaded and conquered Maigh Seóla in 1051, blinding its king. Cathal mac Tigernán is the next ruler of the kingdom recorded, but only upon his death in 1059. No details are given beyond that he was killed. His relationship to the rest of the dynasty is uncertain.

References

 West or H-Iar Connaught Ruaidhrí Ó Flaithbheartaigh, 1684 (published 1846, ed. James Hardiman).
 Origin of the Surname O'Flaherty, Anthony Matthews, Dublin, 1968, p. 40.
 Irish Kings and High-Kings, Francis John Byrne (2001), Dublin: Four Courts Press, 
 Annals of Ulster at CELT: Corpus of Electronic Texts at University College Cork

People from County Galway
1059 deaths
O'Flaherty dynasty
11th-century Irish monarchs
Year of birth unknown